This following is a current list of the chancellors, vice-chancellors and visitors of universities in the United Kingdom. In most cases, the chancellor is a ceremonial head, while the vice-chancellor is chief academic officer and chief executive.

In Scotland, the principal is the chief executive and is usually ex officio vice-chancellor, which is a purely titular position.

Long service
Since the development of the university sector in the UK there have been several hundred individuals appointed to the role of Vice-Chancellor (or Director, President, Principal). A small number of Vice-Chancellors have served in this capacity for 15 years or more, with some portion of this time in office as a Vice-Chancellor in the UK. They include:

47 Years: George Baird (Edinburgh 1793-1840);

43 Years: Sir Henry Reichel (Bangor 1884-1927);

36 Years: George Campbell (Aberdeen 1759-95);

35 Years: Duncan Macfarlan(Glasgow 1823-58), John Mackay (Dundee 1895-1930);

34 Years: Hector Boece (Aberdeen 1500-34), Sir Hector Hetherington GBE (Glasgow 1936-61 Liverpool 1927-36);

33 Years: Neil Campbell (Glasgow 1728-61);

31 Years: Sir James Irvine (St Andrews 1921-52), Sir Emrys Evans (Bangor 1927-58);

30 Years: Patrick Sharp (Glasgow 1585-1615), William Robertson (Edinburgh 1762-92);

29 Years: John Adamson (Edinburgh 1623-1652), Sir James Donaldson (St Andrews 1886-1915);

28 Years: Charles Thorp (Durham 1834-1862), Thomas Roberts (Aberystwyth 1891-1919), Arthur Lowie (Heriot-Watt 1900-28), Ellen Charlotte Higgins (RHC 1907-35);

27 Years: John Stirling (Glasgow 1701-28);

26 Years: George Smith (Aberdeen 1909-35), Sir Charles Evans (Bangor 1958-1984), Michael Driscoll (Taylor's 2015-ff Middlesex 1996-2015);

25 Years: John Strang (Glasgow 1626-51), William Lake (Durham 1844-69), John Caird (Glasgow 1873-98), John Murray (Exeter 1926-51), Sir Albert Sloman (Essex 1962-51), Sir Aubrey Trotman-Dickenson(Cardiff 1968-93);

24 Years: William Leechman Glasgow 1761-85), Sir William Halliday (KCL 1928-52);

22 Years: Edward Wright (Glasgow 1662-84), Sir David Brewster (St Andrews 1837-59), Dame Margaret Tuke (Bedford 1907-29), James Smail OBE (Heriot-Watt 1928-50), Baron Stopford (Manchester 1934-56);

21 Years: Henry Charteris (Edinburgh 1599-1620), Sir Edward Ross (SOAS 1916-37), Geraldine Jebb CBE (Bedford 1930-51), Bill Bevan CBE (Cardiff 1966-87), Tim Wheeler (Chester 1998-2019);

20 Years: William Taylor (Glasgow 1803-23), Sir John LeFevre (London 1842-62), Sir Donald MacAlister KCB (Glasgow 1909-29), Sir Frederick Rees (Cardiff 1929-49), Sir Alexander Carr-Saunders (London 1937-57), Sir Philip Morris (Bristol 1946-66), Sir Robert Aitken (Birmingham 1953-68 Otago 1948-53), Baron Butterworth (Warwick 1965-85), John Watson (St Andrews 1966-86), Sir Cyril Philips (SOAS 1956-76), Sir Graeme Davies (London 2003-10 Glasgow 1995-2003 Liverpool 1986-91), Sir Colin Campbell (Nottingham 1988-2008), Sir Timothy O'Shea (Edinburgh 2002-18 Birkbeck 1998-2002);

19 Years: John Lee (Edinburgh 1840-59), Thomas Edmonds (Aberwystwyth 1872-91), Sir Oliver Lodge (Birmingham 1900-19), Sir Ralph Turner (SOAS 1937-56), Frank Thistlethwaite CBE (East Anglia 1961-80), Sir Fraser Noble (Aberdeen 1976-81 Leicester 1962-76), Baron Chilver (Cranfield 1970-89), Raymond Rickett (Middlesex 1972-91), Anthony Kelly CBE (Surrey 1975-94), Sir Michael Stirling (Birmingham 201-09 Brunel 1990-2001), Alan Gilbert AO (Manchester 2004-10 Melbourne 1996-2004 Tasmania 1991-96), Paul Wellings CBE (Wollongong 2012-21 Lancaster 2002-12), Gerald Pillay OBE (Liverpool Hope 2003-22), David Green CBE (Worcester 2003-ff), David Latchman CBE (Birkbeck 2003-ff);

18 Years: William Wishart (secundus) (Edinburgh 1736-54), Archibald Davidson (Glasgow 1785-1803), John Jones (Cardiff 1883-1901), Sir William Muir KCSI (Edinburgh 1885-1903), William Beveridge (LSE 1919-37), Sir Raymond Priestley (Birmingham 1938-52 Melbourne 1934-38), Ifor Evans (Aberwystwyth 1934-52), Sir James Mountford (Liverpool 1945-63), Sir Steve Smith (Exeter 2002-20);

17 Years: Sir Alexander Grant (Edinburgh 1868-85), Ernest Griffiths (Cardiff 1901-18), Sir Franklin Sibly (Reading 1929-46), Edith Batho (RHC 1945-62), Bertrand Hallward (Nottingham 1948-65), Sir Edward Appleton GBIE KCB (Edinburgh 1948-65), Anthony Steel OBE (Cardiff 1949-66), Hugh Nisbet CBE (Heriot-Watt 1950-67), Sir Derman Christopherson (Durham 1961-78), Geoffrey Templeman CBE (Kent 1963-80), Sir Samuel Curran (Strathclyde 1964-81), Brian Flowers (London 1985-90 Imperial 1973-85), Geoffrey Sim OBE (Sheffield 1974-91), Sir Martin Harris (Manchester 1992-04, Essex 1987-92), Tessa Blackstone (Greenwich 2004-11 Birkbeck 1987-97), Frank Hartley (Cranfield 1989-2006), Dame Glynis Breakwell DBE (Bath 2001-18), Brian Cantor CBE (Bradford 2013-19 York 2002-13), Sir Michael Arthur (UCL 2013-21 Leeds 2004-13), Sir Peter Gregson (Cranfield 2013-21 Queens Belfast 2004-13), George Holmes (Bolton 2005-ff);

16 Years: Sir Alfred Dale (Liverpool 1903-1919), Sir Peter Noble (KCL 1952-68), Sir Charles Carter (Lancaster 1964-80), Frederick Crawford (Aston 1980-96), Sir Michael Thompson (Birmingham 1987-96 East Anglia 1980-86), Sir John Kingman (Bristol 1985-2001), Sir Adrian Smith (London 2012-18 QMC 1998-2008), Sir Alan Langlands (Leeds 2013-20 Dundee 2000-09), Calie Pistorius (Hull 2009-17 Pretoria 2001-09), Sir David Eastwood (Birmingham 2009-21 East Anglia 2002-06), Richard Davies (Swansea 2003-19), Alice Gast (Imperial 2014-22 Lehigh 2006-14), John Cater CBE (Edge Hill 2006-ff);

15 Years: Duncan Bunch (Glasgow 1460-75), Richard Jeff (KCL 1843-68), Elizabeth Reid (Bedford 1849-64), Thomas Barley (Glasgow 1858-73), Alfred Barry (KCL 1868-83), Thomas Hamilton (Queens Belfast 1908-23), Sir Charles Robertson (Birmingham 1923-38), Sir Thomas Holland KCSI KCIE (Edinburgh 1929-44), Sir Irvine Masson (Sheffield 1938-53), Baron Morris (Leeds 1948-63), Sir Sydney Caine KCMG (LSE 1957-67 Malaya 1952-57), Sir Robert Aiken (Birmingham 1953-68), Sir Charles Wilson (Glasgow 1961-76), Sir Alec Merrison (Bristol 1969-84), Sir Howard Newby CBE (Liverpool 2008-14 West England 2006-08 Southampton 1994-2001), Brenda Gourley (Open 2002-09 Kwa-Zulu Natal 1994-2002), Dame Janet Finch DBE (Keele 1995-2010), Malcolm McVicar (UCLAN 1998-13), David VandeLinde (Warwick 2001-06 Bath 1992-2001), Steven Schwartz AM (Macquarie 2006-11 Brunel 2002-06 Murdoch 1996-2002), Frank Morgan OBE (Bath Spa 1997-2012), Sir Bob Burgess (Leicester 1999-2014), Paul O'Prey CBE (Roehampton 2004-19), Dame Janet Beer DBE (Liverpool 2015-22 Oxford Brooks 2007-15), Hugh Brady (Imperial 2022-ff Bristol 2015-22 UCD 2004-13), Colin Riordan (Cardiff 2012-ff Essex 2007-12).

italics: Driscoll, Green, Latchman, Holmes, Cater, Brady and Riordan are currently in office (as at September 2022).

See also
Lists of university leaders
List of vice-chancellors of the University of Cambridge
List of vice-chancellors of the University of Oxford
List of vice-chancellors of the University of London
List of vice-chancellors of the University of Wales, Lampeter

References

University Chancellors and Vice-Chancellors
 

United Kingdom
British